The 2022–23 synchronized skating season began on July 1, 2022, and will end on June 30, 2023. Running concurrent with the 2022–23 figure skating season. During this season, elite synchronized skating teams will compete in the ISU Championship level at the 2023 World Championships, and through the Challenger Series. They will also be competing at various other elite level international and national competitions.

From March 1, 2022 onwards, the International Skating Union banned all athletes and officials from Russia and Belarus from attending any international competitions due to the 2022 Russian invasion of Ukraine.

Competitions 
The 2022–23 season currently includes the following major competitions.

 Key

International medalists

References 

2022 in figure skating
2023 in figure skating
Seasons in synchronized skating
Synchronized skating